The Das Antas River is a river of Rio Grande do Sul state in southern Brazil. Below its junction with the Carreiro it forms the Taquari River.

See also
List of rivers of Rio Grande do Sul

References

Rivers of Rio Grande do Sul